Outlook is a town in west central Saskatchewan, Canada about 80 km south-southwest of Saskatoon.  It is located along the South Saskatchewan River downstream from Gardiner Dam and the Coteau Creek Hydroelectric Station.

History
Settlement of the area began in the early 1900s with farmers and immigrants moving into the area looking for farmland.  Outlook officially started as a settlement on August 26, 1908  when the Canadian Pacific Railway commenced the auction of lots.

On November 23, 1908 the citizens of Outlook welcomed the first train which arrived from Moose Jaw. Within the month the CPR was running a tri-weekly train service carrying huge piles of lumber, however the supply of workers and materials was far outweighed by the demand for more buildings. The Outlook CPR Station building was built in 1909 and a year later, on November 1, 1910, Outlook was officially declared a town. In 1912 the Skytrail bridge crossing the South Saskatchewan River was finished, allowing both passenger and commercial traffic to cross the river in the area for the first time without using the ferry.

In 1910, a fire broke out in the hardware store in town, spreading rapidly and eventually grew to the size of a city block.

Demographics 

Arts and culture
Outlook's arts program includes the Equinox Theatre, a community theatre group that puts on one to two productions a year. They have put on such productions such as Anne of Green Gables (starring Marcia Orton as Anne, and Alexander Haugen as Gilbert) and The Little Mermaid (starring Madeline Codling as Ariel, and Gavin Fleck as Prince Eric). In the past, the group would work in Conjunction with the LCBI theatre group.

The Outlook and District Community Arts Council recently opened an art gallery in the Town Office Building.

Attractions
 Outlook & District Regional Park is situated along the South Saskatchewan River. It has 50 electrified campsites, an outdoor heated junior size Olympic swimming pool and paddling pool for toddlers, hiking trails and the 9-hole Riverview Golf Course.
The Skytrail Bridge is an old railway bridge, converted for pedestrian use; it is 3000 feet long and stands 156 ft above the South Saskatchewan River. The skytrail bridge is currently closed to the public due to unsafe conditions. 
Outlook railway station building is home to the Outlook & District Heritage Museum The museum has over 2500 artifacts from the Outlook area.  Some of the highlights include:
 a caboose 
 an arrowhead and stone tool collection 
 an old holding cell from the Broderick train station
 an antique wood stove
 a collection of over 400 salt & pepper shakers 
 antique hospital equipment donated by the Outlook Union Hospital
 the original printing press from Outlook Printers
 the proposed model plan of Gardiner Dam and Lake Diefenbaker
 original artwork by acclaimed artist Arthur Evoy who was born in Outlook
 The Canada Saskatchewan Irrigation Diversification Centre, a research facility located on the outskirts of town, tests different crops, diseases, chemicals under dryland and irrigation. The Centre has many tours during the summer as well as a field day in July.
Danielson Provincial Park is 50 km south on Highway 219 and  Highway 44 provides access to Gardiner Dam.

Climate

Outlook has a humid continental climate (Dfb).

Sports

The Outlook Recreation Complex has a skating rink, a 4-sheet curling rink, a 4-lane bowling alley and an indoor archery range. Adjacent are five baseball diamonds. As of 2021, The Outlook Recreation Complex also offers a multi-sport court in the summer months, including Basketball, Pickleball, Shuffleboard, Volleyball, Badminton, Lacrosse, Floor Hockey, Tennis, and more by the use of painted lines on the Rink's Concrete pad.

The Jim Kook Arena in the Complex is home to many sports programs throughout the year, including the Outlook Minor Sports program. It is home to the Outlook Ice Hawks senior hockey team.

The Outlook Stock Car Association maintains a stock car 1/3 mile high banked clay oval track. The track runs 10 or more races a season.

Outlook is home to the MBBL fantasy baseball draft, which is famous for Pistol Pete singing “The Cover of the Rolling Stone” at The Matador.

Infrastructure
Outlook Airport is located South East of Outlook.
Outlook used to have an award-winning recycling program that has been recognized across North America.  The Town of Outlook has recycled nearly three million lbs of cardboard as of 2003, and nearly 2 million lbs of newspaper. During 2019, the local program was scrapped for Loraas pickup based in Saskatoon.

Education
Outlook is located within the Sun West School Division.  
Outlook High School - a public school offering grades 6–12 which also houses the Wheatland Library Outlook Branch. Outlook High School is home to the Blues athletics program, which includes football, volleyball, basketball, badminton, curling and cross-country.
 Outlook Elementary School is a public school offering grades K–5.
Lutheran Collegiate Bible Institute is a fully-accredited high school offering grades 9–12, with residences for 120 students
Great Plains College, Outlook Campus

Notable people
 William Thompson Badger (1884–1926) – mayor of Outlook; politician and farmer
 Charles Francis Bolton (born 1932) – neurologist
 Pete Ferry (1914–1971) – curler
 Marcia Kilgore (born 1968) – beauty industry entrepreneur
 Brock Myrol (1975–2005) – one of the four Royal Canadian Mounted Police constables killed in the Mayerthorpe tragedy
 Kirk Reynolds (born 1974) – Olympic sports shooter
 Samantha Ridgewell (born 1996) – professional ice hockey goaltender
 Don Saxton (born 1956) – Olympic volleyball player
 Bob Stephenson (born 1954) – mayor of Outlook; politician and professional ice hockey player
 Logan Stephenson (born 1986) – professional ice hockey player
 Shay Stephenson (born 1983) – professional ice hockey player

References

Division No. 11, Saskatchewan
Towns in Saskatchewan
Populated places on the South Saskatchewan River